Ty Jeremy Jerome (born July 8, 1997) is an American professional basketball player for the Golden State Warriors of the National Basketball Association (NBA), on a two-way contract with the Santa Cruz Warriors of the NBA G League. He played college basketball for the Virginia Cavaliers; where in 2019 he was the starting point guard on their national championship team. Jerome was drafted by the Philadelphia 76ers in the 2019 NBA draft but was traded to the Phoenix Suns.

Early years
Jerome attended Iona Preparatory School in New Rochelle, New York and was a four-year varsity player. After his junior season at Iona Prep, he was named first-team All-Conference, All-Metropolitan, and All-State. Jerome's senior season was cut short due to a hip injury. On September 2, 2014, Jerome committed to playing college basketball at the University of Virginia.

College career
During his freshman year at Virginia, Jerome was the backup point guard to London Perrantes. Coming off the bench, he averaged 4.3 points, 1.6 rebounds, and 1.5 assists.

Jerome took over as the Cavaliers' starting point guard his sophomore year. On December 30, 2017, he put up a career-high 31 points against Boston College. His play during the season earned him a spot on the All-ACC Third Team.

Prior to the 2018-2019 season, Jerome was selected to the pre-season all-ACC Second Team. On February 4, 2019, Jerome was named as one of the ten finalists for the Bob Cousy Award, recognizing the nation's top college point guard. He was projected in most mock drafts as an early second-round pick in the 2019 NBA draft. Jerome averaged 13.6 points per game and 5.5 assists per game, helping lead Virginia to another #1 seed in the 2019 NCAA tournament. Virginia would win the 2019 Championship game 85-77 behind Jerome's 16 points, 8 assists, and 6 rebounds.

At the conclusion of the season, Jerome announced his intention to forgo his final season of collegiate eligibility and declare for the 2019 NBA draft while hiring an agent.

Professional career

Phoenix Suns (2019–2020)
On June 20, 2019, the Philadelphia 76ers selected Jerome with the 24th pick in the 2019 NBA draft. His rights were later traded to the Boston Celtics alongside Philadelphia's 33rd pick for the draft rights to Matisse Thybulle before being traded to the Phoenix Suns alongside Aron Baynes for a future first round pick. Coincidentally, both players the Suns traded for were recruited out of high school and played their college basketball for Tony Bennett: Baynes at Washington State and Jerome at Virginia. On July 6, the Suns announced that they had signed Jerome. Before the start of the season, Jerome sprained his right ankle on October 21, leaving him out indefinitely. On November 25, Jerome was assigned to the Northern Arizona Suns. Jerome played the next day in a loss against the Iowa Wolves before being recalled by Phoenix on November 27. Jerome was assigned to Northern Arizona again on November 29 for a game against the Sioux Falls Skyforce before being recalled to Phoenix a day later.

Jerome made his NBA debut on December 2, 2019 in a 109–104 win over the Charlotte Hornets with four points, four assists, three rebounds, and three steals in 12 minutes of play. On December 21, Jerome scored a season-high 15 points on 6-of-8 shooting in a 139–125 loss to the Houston Rockets. Jerome was later assigned to the Northern Arizona Suns for a game on March 4 before returning to Phoenix a day later.

Oklahoma City Thunder (2020–2022)
On November 16, 2020, Jerome was traded to the Oklahoma City Thunder alongside Kelly Oubre Jr., Ricky Rubio, Jalen Lecque, and a 2022 first-round pick in exchange for Chris Paul and Abdel Nader. He was assigned to the Thunder's G League affiliate, the Oklahoma City Blue, still recovering from a severe left ankle sprain suffered a year earlier. He made his debut playing limited minutes for the Blue on February 11, 2021. Jerome made his Thunder debut in a game against the Atlanta Hawks on February 26. He finished the game with 9 points, 5 rebounds, and 7 assists in 22 minutes. Ty scored his career high in points, 23, against the Cleveland Cavaliers on April 8.

On March 8, 2022, Jerome underwent season-ending groin surgery.

On September 30, 2022, Jerome was traded, along with Derrick Favors, Maurice Harkless, Théo Maledon and a future second-round pick, to the Houston Rockets in exchange for David Nwaba, Sterling Brown, Trey Burke, and Marquese Chriss. The following day, he was waived.

Golden State Warriors (2022–present)
Jerome was signed to the Golden State Warriors on October 4, 2022 for the rest of the preseason, he then signed to a two-way contract to play along with the affiliate Santa Cruz Warriors of the NBA G League.

Career statistics

NBA

Regular season

|-
| style="text-align:left;"| 
| style="text-align:left;"| Phoenix
| 31 || 0 || 10.6 || .336 || .280 || .750 || 1.5 || 1.4 || .5 || .1 || 3.3
|-
| style="text-align:left;"| 
| style="text-align:left;"| Oklahoma City
| 33 || 1 || 23.9 || .446 || .423 || .765 || 2.8 || 3.6 || .6 || .2 || 10.7
|-
| style="text-align:left;"| 
| style="text-align:left;"| Oklahoma City
| 48 || 4 || 16.7 || .378 || .290 || .809 || 1.6 || 2.3 || .6 || .1 || 7.1
|- class="sortbottom"
| style="text-align:center;" colspan="2"| Career
| 112 || 5 || 17.1 || .398 || .344 || .784 || 1.9 || 2.4 || .6 || .1 || 7.1

College

|-
| style="text-align:left;"| 2016–17
| style="text-align:left;"| Virginia
| 34 || 5 || 13.9 || .473 || .397 || .778 || 1.6 || 1.5 || .4 || .1 || 4.3
|-
| style="text-align:left;"| 2017–18
| style="text-align:left;"| Virginia
| 34 || 34 || 30.8 || .421 || .379 || .905 || 3.1 || 3.9 || 1.6 || .0 || 10.6
|-
| style="text-align:left;"| 2018–19
| style="text-align:left;"| Virginia
| 37 || 37 || 33.9 || .435 || .399 || .736 || 4.2 || 5.5 || 1.5 || .0 || 13.6
|- class="sortbottom"
| style="text-align:center;" colspan="2"| Career
| 105 || 76 || 26.4 || .435 || .392 || .788 || 3.0 || 3.7 || 1.2 || .0 || 9.6

Personal life
Jerome's parents are Mark Jerome and Melanie Walker. He is a biracial African American and has two brothers and two sisters. His paternal grandmother was active in the Civil Rights Movement with the Congress of Racial Quality, and her husband Fred was a photographer who covered the movement.

Jerome majored in American Studies while at the University of Virginia. His favorite player in the NBA growing up was Steve Nash.

References

External links
Virginia Cavaliers bio

1997 births
Living people
American men's basketball players
Basketball players from New York City
Golden State Warriors players
Northern Arizona Suns players
Oklahoma City Blue players
Oklahoma City Thunder players
Philadelphia 76ers draft picks
Phoenix Suns players
Point guards
Sportspeople from New Rochelle, New York
Virginia Cavaliers men's basketball players